Josiah Zion Gumede, GCLM, MBE (19 September 1919 – 28 March 1989) was the first and only president of the self-proclaimed, and internationally unrecognised, state of Zimbabwe Rhodesia during 1979, before Rhodesia briefly reverted to British rule until the country's independence as Zimbabwe in 1980.

Biography 

Josiah Gumede was born in Bembesi, in the Bubi District (now in Matabeleland North) of Southern Rhodesia. He was educated at the David Livingstone Memorial Mission and Matopo Mission before matriculating in the Cape Province (South Africa) in 1946. He taught at various mission and government schools and ended his teaching career as a headmaster. He was the assistant information and education attache for the Government of Rhodesia and Nyasaland at Rhodesia House in London between 1960 and 1962, before being appointed First Secretary in the office of the Commissioner for Rhodesia and Nyasaland in Nairobi. He then joined the Ministry of External Affairs (1963–1965).

He was at one time general secretary for the then African Teachers' Association of Rhodesia; a member of the Wankie Disaster Relief Fund's Board of Trustees; a director of the Tribal Trust Land Development Corporation; and a board member of the National Free Library of Rhodesia. He was also an ordained elder of the Presbyterian Church of South Africa.

Gumede was the grandfather of British television actress, Natalie Gumede.

References

Newitt, Louise (ed). Prominent Rhodesian Personalities (Cover Publicity Services, Salisbury, 1977).

1919 births
1989 deaths
Rhodesian Members of the Order of the British Empire
People from Matabeleland North Province
Zimbabwean politicians
Heads of state of states with limited recognition
Heads of state of former countries